Elections for the 6th Provincial assembly of Sindh were held on 10 March, following the 1977 general elections held on 7 March 1977, along with provincial elections in Punjab, Balochistan & N.W.F.P.

List of members of the 6th Provincial Assembly of Sindh 

Tenure of the 6th Provincial assembly of Sindh was from 30 March till 5 July 1977, it was the shortest provincial assembly. General Zia-ul-Haq declared martial law on 5 July dissolving all assemblies in Pakistan including that of Sindh.

References 

Provincial Assembly of Sindh
Politics of Sindh
1977 elections in Pakistan